Yosef Baraki (born November 10, 1989) is a Canadian filmmaker, writer, editor and film producer. He is best known for his feature film debut Mina Walking, which premiered at the 65th Berlin International Film Festival and won the inaugural Discovery Award at the 4th Canadian Screen Awards in 2016.

His work is characterized by unconventional dramatic structure and realism focused on the spiritual.

Early life

Baraki studied film and television production and philosophy at Toronto's York University and Humber College.

References

External links 
 

1989 births
Canadian film producers
Canadian male screenwriters
Living people
Canadian people of Afghan descent
Asian-Canadian filmmakers